Eveline Bhend (born 6 April 1981) is a Swiss freestyle skier. She was born in Unterseen. She competed at the 2014 Winter Olympics in Sochi, in slopestyle, where she placed ninth in the final.

References

1981 births
Living people
Freestyle skiers at the 2014 Winter Olympics
Swiss female freestyle skiers
Olympic freestyle skiers of Switzerland
21st-century Swiss women